Irvin G. "Irv" Maze is an American lawyer who served as a judge of the Kentucky Court of Appeals from 2012 to 2023. He is a former circuit court judge in Jefferson County, Kentucky (Louisville) and  previously elected to three terms as county attorney for Jefferson County.

Maze graduated from Indiana University in 1972, and University of Louisville Brandeis School of Law in 1975.  He and his wife Peggy have 5 children.

Prior to being elected Jefferson County Attorney, Maze was elected to multiple terms to the Jefferson County Fiscal Court before Louisville and Jefferson County were merged in 2002.

In winning his first term as Jefferson County Attorney, Maze defeated Republican nominee Steve Pence, who later served as Lieutenant Governor of Kentucky (2003–07).

In 2007, Maze ran for Lieutenant Governor of Kentucky as the running mate of Jonathan Miller; however, they dropped out of the race prior to the primary election, and endorsed eventual general election winner Steve Beshear.

Maze won re-election to a third term as Jefferson County Attorney in 2006. In 2008 he was appointed to a vacant judgeship on the Jefferson County Circuit Court. In 2012, Maze was appointed to the Kentucky Court of Appeals.

See also 
 Kentucky gubernatorial election, 2007

References

External links 
 Miller-Maze Campaign website (archived)
 Jim Pence interviews Irv Maze

Indiana University alumni
Kentucky lawyers
Kentucky state court judges
Living people
Politicians from Louisville, Kentucky
American prosecutors
Judges of the Kentucky Court of Appeals
1958 births